Austertana is a village in Deatnu-Tana Municipality in Troms og Finnmark county, Norway.  The village is located along one of the inner bays of the large Tanafjorden, east of Rustefjelbma in northeastern Tana.  The village is home to the Austertana Chapel.  Austertana has the world's second largest quartzite quarry.

The Norwegian County Road 890 runs through the village.  That road is the only road access to Båtsfjord Municipality and Berlevåg Municipality to the northeast on the Varanger Peninsula.

References

Villages in Finnmark
Tana, Norway
Populated places of Arctic Norway